Abacetus dekkanus is a species of ground beetle in the subfamily Pterostichinae. It was described by Andrewes in 1942.

References

dekkanus
Beetles described in 1942